Something Must Break is a 2014 Swedish drama film directed by Ester Martin Bergsmark. Saga Becker won the Guldbagge Award for Best Actress in a Leading Role for her performance as Sebastian, a trans teen.

Cast 
 Saga Becker - Sebastian
  - Andreas
 Shima Niavarani - Lea
 Mattias Åhlén - Mattias

References

External links 

2014 drama films
Swedish LGBT-related films
Films about trans women
2014 LGBT-related films
2010s Swedish films